Jordan Marvin Sigalet (born February 19, 1981) is a Canadian ice hockey coach and former goaltender who played one game in the National Hockey League for the Boston Bruins in 2006. In 2004, while playing at Bowling Green University, Sigalet was diagnosed with Multiple Sclerosis. He continued playing until 2009 when he retired and turned to coaching. In 2014 he joined the Calgary Flames as their goaltending coach. His brother Jonathan also played in one NHL game with the Boston Bruins.

Playing career

University
Sigalet played collegiate hockey at Bowling Green University. On February 27 and 28 2003, he played two games against Northern Michigan University. He stopped 66 shot attempts combined. Sigalet ended the 2003 NCAA hockey season in a playoff loss.

As a junior, Sigalet was diagnosed with multiple sclerosis in March 2004 but only announced his condition in December. Many fellow hockey players were inspired by him: the entire Nebraska-Omaha hockey team autographed a jersey and sent it to him. Players from University of Michigan and from Boston College also sent him signed items. In addition, he became the first goalie to hold the position of team captain at Bowling Green.

During the 2005 NCAA season, Sigalet blocked 92 percent of the shots taken against him. He was voted captain and named a Hobey Baker finalist.

Professional career
Despite his diagnosis, Sigalet was drafted by the Boston Bruins after his senior year. Sigalet made his NHL debut on January 7, 2006 against the Tampa Bay Lightning, as a backup for Andrew Raycroft. Raycroft sprained his ankle in the third period, letting Sigalet play the final 43 seconds.

On November 16, 2007, during a game with the Worcester Sharks, Sigalet collapsed on the ice due to Multiple Sclerosis. He was placed in rehab for a month to recover.

Sigalet joined the Vienna Capitals on 25 January 2009 and left Gazovik Tyumen.

Coaching career

Sigalet was named goaltending coach of the Everett Silvertips August 3, 2010. On August 3, 2011 Sigalet was hired as a goaltending coach for the Abbotsford Heat of the American Hockey League. On August 19, 2014, the Calgary Flames of the National Hockey League announced Sigalet as their new goalie coach.

Off the ice
Sigalet became an ambassador for the Multiple Sclerosis Rhode Island chapter. Sigalet participated in a fundraiser supported by the Providence Bruins and pharmaceutical company Serono (maker of MS treatment Rebif) called "Sigalet Saves For MS" that donated 20 dollars for every save he made.

Career statistics

Regular season and playoffs

Awards and achievements

References

External links
 

1981 births
Living people
Boston Bruins draft picks
Boston Bruins players
Bowling Green Falcons men's ice hockey players
Calgary Flames coaches
Canadian expatriate ice hockey players in Austria
Canadian ice hockey coaches
Canadian ice hockey goaltenders
Canadian people of Swedish descent
Ice hockey people from British Columbia
Providence Bruins players
Sportspeople from New Westminster
Vienna Capitals players
Victoria Salsa players